Juan Matute (born 16 January 1951) is a Spanish equestrian. He competed at the 1988 Summer Olympics, the 1992 Summer Olympics and the 1996 Summer Olympics.

References

1951 births
Living people
Spanish male equestrians
Spanish dressage riders
Olympic equestrians of Spain
Equestrians at the 1988 Summer Olympics
Equestrians at the 1992 Summer Olympics
Equestrians at the 1996 Summer Olympics
Sportspeople from Bilbao